Baucina is a comune (municipality) in the Metropolitan City of Palermo in the Italian region of Sicily, located about  southeast of Palermo.

Baucina borders the following municipalities: Bolognetta, Caccamo, Casteldaccia, Ciminna, Ventimiglia di Sicilia, Villafrati.

Demographic evolution

References

Municipalities of the Metropolitan City of Palermo